Huang Zhun (born 27 January 1989) is a Qingdao, Shandong, Chinese footballer who currently plays for Dandong Tengyue in the China League Two.

Club career
Huang Zhun started his professional football career in 2008 when he joined Chongqing Lifan for the 2008 China League One campaign. 
In March 2009, Huang transferred to Chinese Super League side Qingdao Jonoon. On 14 June 2009, he made his debut for Qingdao Jonoon in the 2009 Chinese Super League against Shenzhen Ruby, coming on as a substitute for Zou Zheng in the 90th minute. 
In March 2012, Pang transferred to China League One side Shenyang Dongjin.

In March 2014, Pang transferred to China League Two side Guizhou Zhicheng. He would be part of the squad that gained promotion to their second tier at the end of the 2014 China League Two campaign.

Career statistics 
Statistics accurate as of match played 31 December 2020.

References

External links

1989 births
Living people
Chinese footballers
Footballers from Shandong
Chongqing Liangjiang Athletic F.C. players
Qingdao Hainiu F.C. (1990) players
Shenyang Dongjin players
Guizhou F.C. players
Sichuan Jiuniu F.C. players
Chinese Super League players
China League One players
Association football defenders